The following is a list of albums released by Interscope Records.

1990s

1991 
 2Pac - 2Pacalypse Now
 Gerardo - Mo' Ritmo
 Marky Mark and the Funky Bunch - Music for the People
 Primus - Sailing The Seas Of Cheese
 The Storm - The Storm
Various artists - Bill & Ted's Bogus Journey Soundtrack

1992 
 4 Non Blondes - Bigger, Better, Faster, More!
 Dr. Dre - The Chronic (Death Row/Priority)
 Helmet - Meantime
 Marky Mark and the Funky Bunch - You Gotta Believe (Atlantic)
 Nine Inch Nails - Broken (Nothing/TVT)
 No Doubt - No Doubt
 Primus - Miscellaneous Debris (Atlantic)
 Unruly Child - Unruly Child
3 Shades Of Brown - Stronger Than Strong
Colourhaus - Colourhaus
Love on Ice - Nude

1993 
 2Pac - Strictly 4 My N.I.G.G.A.Z.
 Akinyele - Vagina Diner
 Snoop Doggy Dogg - Doggystyle (Death Row)

1994 
 Blackstreet - Blackstreet (Atlantic)
 Bush - Sixteen Stone
 Cop Shoot Cop - Release
 Drive Like Jehu - Yank Crime
 Helmet - Betty
 Marilyn Manson - Portrait of an American Family (Nothing)
 Nine Inch Nails - The Downward Spiral (Nothing)
 Sinister- Mobbin 4 Life (Atlantic)
 Toadies - Rubberneck
 Thug Life - Thug Life: Volume 1
 Various artists - Above the Rim (Death Row)
 Various artists - Murder Was the Case (Death Row)
 Various artists - Natural Born Killers (soundtrack) (Nothing)

1995 
 2Pac - Me Against the World
 All - Pummel
 Dish - Boneyard Beach
 Tha Dogg Pound - Dogg Food (Death Row/Priority)
 Marilyn Manson - Smells Like Children (Nothing)
 No Doubt - Tragic Kingdom
Various artists - Showgirls Soundtrack

1996 
 2Pac - All Eyez on Me (Death Row)
 2Pac (as Makaveli) - The Don Killuminati: The 7 Day Theory (Death Row)
 Blackstreet - Another Level
 Bush - Razorblade Suitcase
 Dr. Dre - Dr. Dre Presents the Aftermath (Aftermath)
 Lifter - Melinda (Everything Was Beautiful and Nothing Hurt)
 Marilyn Manson - Antichrist Superstar (Nothing)
 Snoop Doggy Dogg - Tha Doggfather (Death Row)
 Various artists - Christmas on Death Row (Death Row)
 Various artists - Death Row Greatest Hits (Death Row)

1997 
 2Pac - R U Still Down? (Remember Me) (Amaru/Jive)
 Artificial Joy Club - Melt 
 Helmet - Aftertaste
 Jurassic 5 - Jurassic 5 (EP) (Rumble Records)
 The Lady of Rage - Necessary Roughness (Death Row)
 Limp Bizkit - Three Dollar Bill, Y'all (Flip)
 Marilyn Manson - Remix & Repent (Nothing)
 Pink Noise Test - Plasticised
 Smash Mouth - Fush Yu Mang
 The Firm - The Album (Aftermath)
 The Whispers - Songbook Volume 1: The Songs Of Babyface
 Transistor - Transister
 Various artists - Gridlock'd (Death Row)

1998 
 2Pac - Greatest Hits (Amaru/Death Row)
 The Black Eyed Peas - Behind the Front (will.i.am Music Group)
 Marilyn Manson - Mechanical Animals (Nothing)
 Mya - Mya
Various artists - Bulworth Soundtrack

1999 

 2Pac & Outlawz - Still I Rise (Death Row)
 Bush - The Science of Things
 Dr. Dre - 2001 (Aftermath)
 Eminem - The Slim Shady LP (Aftermath)
 Jordan Knight - Jordan Knight
 Limp Bizkit - Significant Other (Flip)
 Marilyn Manson - The Last Tour on Earth (Nothing)
 Nine Inch Nails - The Fragile (Nothing)
 Smash Mouth - Astro Lounge
 Various artists - Wild Wild West (soundtrack)

2000s

2000 
 2Pac - The Rose That Grew from Concrete (Amaru)
 The Black Eyed Peas - Bridging the Gap (will.i.am Music Group)
 Drag-On - Opposite of H2O (Ruff Ryderse)
 Eminem - The Marshall Mathers LP (Aftermath)
 Jurassic 5 - Quality Control
 Limp Bizkit - Chocolate Starfish and the Hot Dog Flavored Water
 The LOX - We Are the Streets (Ruff Ryders)
 Marilyn Manson - Holy Wood (In the Shadow of the Valley of Death) (Nothing)
 Mya - Fear Of Flying
 No Doubt - Return of Saturn
 Queens of the Stone Age - Rated R
 U2 - All That You Can't Leave Behind (Island)

2001 
 2Pac - Until the End of Time (Amaru/Death Row)
 D12 - Devil's Night (Shady)
 Eve - Scorpion (Ruff Ryders)
 Jadakiss - Kiss tha Game Goodbye (Ruff Ryders)
 Limp Bizkit - New Old Songs
 No Doubt - Rock Steady
 Smash Mouth - Smash Mouth
 Toadies - Hell Below/Stars Above
 Various artists - Ali (soundtrack)
 Various artists - The Wash (soundtrack)

2002 
 2Pac - Better Dayz (Amaru/Death Row)
 ...And You Will Know Us By The Trail of Dead - Source Tags & Codes
 Eminem - The Eminem Show (Shady/Aftermath)
 Jurassic 5 - Power in Numbers
 Styles P - A Gangster and a Gentleman (Ruff Ryders)
 Truth Hurts - Truthfully Speaking (Aftermath)
 t.A.T.u. - 200 km/h in the Wrong Lane (Universal)
 Various artists - 8 Mile: Music from and Inspired by the Motion Picture (Shady)

2003 
 50 Cent - Get Rich or Die Tryin' (Shady/Aftermath)
 Bubba Sparxxx - Deliverance
 Campfire Girls -  Tell Them Hi
 G-Unit - Beg for Mercy (G-Unit)
 Limp Bizkit - Results May Vary
 Obie Trice - Cheers (Shady)
 Marilyn Manson - The Golden Age of Grotesque (Nothing/Interscope)
 Mya - Moodring (A&M/Interscope)
 Smash Mouth - Get the Picture?
 The Black Eyed Peas - Elephunk (will.i.am Music Group/A&M/Interscope)

2004 
 2Pac - Loyal to the Game (Amaru)
 D12 - D12 World (Shady/Interscope)
 Eminem - Encore (Shady/Aftermath)
 Helmet - Size Matters
 Jadakiss - Kiss of Death (Ruff Ryders)
 Jimmy Eat World - Futures (Tiny Evil)
 Lloyd Banks - The Hunger for More (G-Unit)
 Marilyn Manson - Lest We Forget: The Best Of (Nothing)
 Gwen Stefani - Love. Angel. Music. Baby.
 U2 - How to Dismantle an Atomic Bomb
 Young Buck - Straight Outta Cashville (G-Unit)

2005 
 50 Cent - The Massacre (Shady/Aftermath)
 Daddy Yankee - Barrio Fino en Directo (El Cartel)
 Eminem - Curtain Call: The Hits (Shady/Aftermath)
 The Game - The Documentary (Aftermath/G-Unit)
 M.I.A. - Arular (US only - XL Recordings worldwide)
 Nine Inch Nails - With Teeth (Nothing)
 Will Smith - Lost and Found
 t.A.T.u. - Dangerous and Moving (Universal)
 Tony Yayo - Thoughts of a Predicate Felon (G-Unit)

2006 
 +44 - When Your Heart Stops Beating
 2Pac - Pac's Life (Amaru)
 Brand New - The Devil and God Are Raging Inside Me (Tiny Evil)
 Busta Rhymes - The Big Bang (Flipmode/Aftermath)
 Fergie - The Dutchess (will.i.am / A&M)
 Jurassic 5 - Feedback
 Lloyd Banks - Rotten Apple (G-Unit)
 Mobb Deep - Blood Money (G-Unit)
 Obie Trice - Second Round's on Me (Shady)
 Pharrell - In My Mind (Star Trak)
 Gwen Stefani - The Sweet Escape
 Styles P - Time Is Money (Ruff Ryders)
 Robin Thicke - The Evolution of Robin Thicke (Star Trak)
 Various artists - Eminem Presents: The Re-Up (Shady)

2007 
 2Pac - Best of 2Pac (Amaru/Death Row/UMG)
 50 Cent - Curtis (Shady/Aftermath)
 Bone Thugs-n-Harmony - Strength & Loyalty (Full Surface) 
 Daddy Yankee - El Cartel: The Big Boss (El Cartel)
 M.I.A. - Kala (US only - XL Recordings worldwide)
 Marilyn Manson - Eat Me, Drink Me
 Nine Inch Nails - Year Zero
 OneRepublic - Dreaming Out Loud (Mosley Music Group)
 Soulja Boy Tell 'Em - souljaboytellem.com (Stacks On Deck Ent./HHH/Collipark)
 will.i.am - Songs About Girls
 Young Buck - Buck the World (G-Unit)
Maroon 5 - It Won't Be Soon Before Long

2008 
 Vanessa Amorosi - Somewhere in the Real World (Universal Republic UK)
 Black Tide - Light From Above
 G-Unit - T.O.S: Terminate on Sight (G-Unit)
 Sean Garrett - Turbo 919 (Bet I Penned Music)
 Hollywood Undead - Swan Songs
 The Knux - Remind Me in 3 Days... (Chic Freak Music)
 Lady Gaga - The Fame
 M.I.A. - How Many Votes Fix Mix
 N.E.R.D - Seeing Sounds (Star Trak)
 New Kids on the Block - The Block
 Pussycat Dolls - Doll Domination
 Rise Against - Appeal to Reason (Geffen/DGC)
 Soulja Boy Tell 'Em - iSouljaBoyTellEm (Stacks On Deck Ent./HHH/Collipark)
 Robin Thicke - Something Else (Star Trak)

2009 
 50 Cent - Before I Self Destruct (Shady/Aftermath)
 The Black Eyed Peas - The E.N.D.
 Brand New - Daisy (DGC/Procrastinate!)
 Them Crooked Vultures - Them Crooked Vultures (DGC)
 Eminem - Relapse (Shady/Aftermath)
 Hollywood Undead - Desperate Measures
 Lady Gaga - The Fame Monster
 Marilyn Manson - The High End of Low
 Papa Roach - Metamorphosis (DGC)
 Tokio Hotel - Humanoid (album) (Cherrytree)
 U2 - No Line on the Horizon

2010s

2010 
 The Black Eyed Peas - The Beginning
 Keyshia Cole - Calling All Hearts
 Diddy-Dirty Money - Last Train to Paris
 El Debarge - Second Chance
 Eminem - Recovery (Shady/Aftermath)
 Escape The Fate - Escape the Fate
 Far East Movement - Free Wired
 Girlicious - Rebuilt
 Keri Hilson - No Boys Allowed
 M.I.A. - Maya (US only - XL Recordings worldwide)
 N.E.R.D - Nothing
 The Pretty Reckless - The Pretty Reckless EP
 The Pretty Reckless - Light Me Up
 Robyn - Body Talk Pt. 1
 Robyn - Body Talk Pt. 2
 Robyn - Body Talk
 Soulja Boy - The DeAndre Way (SODMG/Collipark)
Maroon 5 - Hands All Over
Die Antwoord - Enter The Ninja

2011 
 All Time Low - Dirty Work
 Bad Meets Evil - Hell: The Sequel (Shady)
 Travis Barker - Give the Drummer Some
 Black Tide - Post Mortem
 Blink-182 - Neighborhoods (DGC)
 Game - The R.E.D. Album (DGC)
 Hollywood Undead - American Tragedy
 Lady Gaga - Born This Way
 Limp Bizkit - Gold Cobra
 Limp Bizkit - Icon
 Lloyd - King of Hearts (Young Goldie)
 Rise Against - Endgame  (DGC)
 Yelawolf - Radioactive (Ghet-O-Vision/DGC/Shady)

2012 
 Azealia Banks - 1991
 Nelly Furtado - The Spirit Indestructible (Mosley)
 Game - Jesus Piece
 Girls' Generation - The Boys (SM Entertainment/UMG)
 Kendrick Lamar - good kid, m.A.A.d city (TDE/Aftermath)
 Lana Del Rey - Born to Die (Polydor/Stranger)
 Machine Gun Kelly - Lace Up (Bad Boy)
 Madonna - MDNA
 No Doubt - Push and Shove
 Haley Reinhart - Listen Up!
 Slaughterhouse - Welcome to: Our House (Shady)
 Soulja Boy - Promise (SODMG/Collipark Music)
 Zedd - Clarity

2013 
 Colette Carr - Skitszo
 Eminem -The Marshall Mathers LP 2 (Shady/Aftermath)
 French Montana - Excuse My French
 Hollywood Undead - Notes From the Underground
 Lady Gaga - Artpop
 M.I.A. - Matangi
 Madonna - MDNA World Tour
 Scotty McCreery -See You Tonight
 Natalia Kills - Trouble
 OneRepublic - Native
 Jessica Sanchez - Me, You & the Music
 Skylar Grey -Don't Look Down
 Robin Thicke - Blurred Lines
 Various Artists - The Great Gatsby: Music from Baz Luhrmann's Film
 will.i.am - #willpower

2014 
 Tony Bennett & Lady Gaga - Cheek To Cheek (Streamline/Interscope/Columbia)
 Lana Del Rey - Ultraviolence
 Maroon 5 - V
 Schoolboy Q - Oxymoron (TDE)
 U2 - Songs of Innocence

2015 
 Dr. Dre - Compton (Aftermath)
 Selena Gomez - Revival
 Kendrick Lamar - To Pimp a Butterfly (Top Dawg/Aftermath)
 Hollywood Undead - Day of the Dead
 Machine Gun Kelly - General Admission (Bad Boy)
 Madonna - Rebel Heart
 Various Artists - Southpaw: Music from and Inspired by the Motion Picture (Shady)
 Yelawolf - Love Story (Slumerican/Shady)
 Zedd - True Colors

2016 
 The 1975 - I Like It When You Sleep, for You Are So Beautiful yet So Unaware of It (Dirty Hit)
 6LACK - Free 6LACK (LoveRenaissance)
 AlunaGeorge - I Remember (Island)
 Bahari - Dancing on the Sun (Bahari Beach)
 Band of Horses - Why Are You OK
 Bas - Too High to Riot (Dreamville)
 Cassius - Ibifornia (Love Justice SARL/Justice SARL)
 DJ Snake - Encore
 Dreezy - No Hard Feelings
 Jack Garratt - Phase (Polydor)
 Goldroom - West of the West (Downtown)
 J. Cole - 4 Your Eyez Only (Dreamville/Roc Nation)
 Carly Rae Jepsen - Emotion Remixed + (604/School Boy)
 Carly Rae Jepsen - Emotion: Side B (604/School Boy)
 K. Flay - Crush Me (Night Street)
 K Camp - Lyric Ave
 Michael Kiwanuka - Love & Hate (Polydor)
 Kendrick Lamar - untitled unmastered (Top Dawg/Aftermath)
 Lady Gaga - Joanne (Streamline)
 Lion Babe - Begin (Polydor)
 M.I.A. - AIM (Polydor)
 Ella Mai - Change (10 Summers)
 OneRepublic - Oh My My (Mosley)
 Rae Sremmurd - SremmLife 2 (EarDrummers)
 The Rolling Stones - Blue & Lonesome (Polydor)
 Schoolboy Q - Blank Face LP (Top Dawg)
 Shura - Nothing's Real (Polydor)
 Skylar Grey - Natural Causes (KidinaKorner)
 Gwen Stefani - This Is What the Truth Feels Like
 Sting - 57th & 9th (A&M)
 Tkay Maidza - Tkay (Downtown)
 Tory Lanez - I Told You (Mad Love)
 Various artists - La La Land: Original Motion Picture Soundtrack

2017 
 50 Cent - Best Of (Shady/Aftermath)
 Lauren Alaina - Road Less Traveled (19/Mercury Nashville)
 blackbear - Cybersex (Beartrap/Alamo)
 Cashmere Cat - 9 (Mad Love)
 Electric Guest - Plural (Downtown)
 Eminem - Revival (Shady/Aftermath)
 Feist - Pleasure (Polydor)
 Ice Cube - Death Certificate (25th Anniversary Reissue) (Lench Mob)
 Imagine Dragons - Evolve (KidinaKorner)
 J.I.D - The Never Story (Dreamville)
 K.Flay - Every Where Is Some Where (Night Street)
 Kendrick Lamar - Damn (Top Dawg/Aftermath)
 Lana Del Rey - Lust for Life (Polydor)
 Machine Gun Kelly - Bloom (Bad Boy)
 Maroon 5 - Red Pill Blues (222)
 Mike Will Made It - Ransom 2 (EarDrummers)
 Mura Masa - Mura Masa (Downtown/Polydor/Anchor Point)
 Oliver - Full Circle
 Playboi Carti - Playboi Carti (AWGE)
 San Fermin - Belong (Downtown)
 Gwen Stefani - You Make It Feel Like Christmas
 Tei Shi - Crawl Space (Downtown)
 Two-9 - FRVR (EarDrummers)
 U2 - Songs of Experience (Island)
 Yelawolf - Trial by Fire (Slumerican/Shady)

2018 
 Børns - Blue Madonna
 Various Artists - Black Panther: The Album (Top Dawg/Aftermath)
 Cozz - Effected (Tha Committee/Dreamville)
 Moneybagg Yo - 2 Heartless (N-Less)
 Wes Period - Pretty Words (Facet)
 Tory Lanez - MEMORIES DON'T DIE (Mad Love)
 Arin Ray - Platinum Fire
 Trouble - Edgewood (Eardruma)
 Rich The Kid - The World Is Yours (Rich Forever Music)
 Kali Uchis - Isolation (Virgin EMI)
 Thirty Seconds to Mars - America
 Smokepurpp & Murda Beatz - Bless Yo Trap (Cactus Jack/Alamo)
 J. Cole - KOD (Dreamville/Roc Nation)
 Sting & Shaggy - 44/876 (A&M)
 Rae Sremmurd - SR3MM (Eardruma)
 6 Dogs & Danny Wolf - 6 Wolves (Trust Me Danny/Mad Love)
 Playboi Carti - Die Lit (AWGE)
 SUR - SAVAGE BEAST
 Juice WRLD - Goodbye & Good Riddance (Grade A)
 Jay Rock - Redemption (Top Dawg)
 Billy Raffoul - 1975
 Colouring - bn
 Moneybagg Yo - Bet On Me (N-Less)
 Bas - Milky Way (Dreamville)
 Eminem - Kamikaze (Shady/Aftermath)
 The Night Game - The Night Game (Real Johnson/Vertigo/Capitol)
 Trill Sammy - No Sleep Vol. 1 (Mad Love)
 Yoshi Flower - Brown Paper Bag (Maxi) (Rock Mafia/GRDN)
 Pale Waves - My Mind Makes Noises (Dirty Hit)
 6LACK - East Atlanta Love Letter (LVRN)
 Machine Gun Kelly - BINGE
 Lady Gaga & Bradley Cooper - A Star Is Born (soundtrack)
 Sheck Wes - MUDBOY (Cactus Jack/GOOD)
 Ella Mai - Ella Mai (10 Summers)
 Yoshi Flower - AMERICAN RAVER (Rock Mafia/GRDN)
 Future & Juice WRLD - Wrld on Drugs (Grade A/Freebandz/Epic)
 Lil Mosey - Northsbest
 Summer Walker - Last Day of Summer (LVRN)
 Black Eyed Peas - Masters of the Sun Vol. 1
 Louis the Child - Kids At Play
 The Struts - YOUNG&DANGEROUS
 Tory Lanez - LoVE me NOw (Mad Love)
 Jacob Banks - Village (Darkroom)
 Jay Critch - Hood Favorite (Rich Forever)
 K Camp - RARE Sound (RARE Sound/EMPIRE)
 Kris Wu - Antares (Ace Unit/Go East/Universal Music China)
 Smino - NØIR (Zero Fatigue/Downtown)
 Imagine Dragons - Origins (KIDinaKORNER)
 Lil Durk - Signed To The Streets 3 (Only The Family/Alamo)
 Nightly - The Sound Of Your Voice
 Mike WiLL Made-It - Creed II: The Album (EarDrummers)
 Moneybagg Yo - RESET (N-Less)
 J.I.D - DiCaprio 2 (Dreamville)
 The 1975 - A Brief Inquiry into Online Relationships (Dirty Hit)
 Blaise Moore - TEMPORARY HER
 Ice Cube - Everythangs Corrupt (Lench Mob)
 Yhung T.O. - Trust Issues (SOB X RBE/Rule #1)
 Gryffin - Gravity, Pt. 1 (Darkroom)

2019 
 Dermot Kennedy - Dermot Kennedy (Riggins/Island)
 Boogie - Everythings for Sale (Shady)
 Dreezy - Big Dreez
 Summer Walker - CLEAR (LVRN)
 Mereba - The Jungle Is The Only Way Out
 DaBaby - Baby on Baby (SCMG)
 The Japanese House - Good at Falling (Dirty Hit)
 Juice Wrld - Death Race for Love (Grade A)
 Louis The Child - Kids At Play (Remixes)
 Lil Poppa - Under Investigation 2 (Rule #1)
 Rich the Kid - The World Is Yours 2 (Rich Forever)
 Yhung T.O. - On My Momma 2 (SOB X RBE/Rule #1)
 Melli - phAses (Rule #1)
 Billie Eilish - WHEN WE ALL FALL ASLEEP, WHERE DO WE GO? (Darkroom)
 Yelawolf - Trunk Muzik III (Slumerican/Shady)
 BLACKPINK - Kill This Love
 Billy Raffoul - The Running Wild EP
 blackbear - Anonymous (Beartrap/Alamo)
 ScHoolboy Q - CrasH Talk (TDE)
 Ari Lennox - Shea Butter Baby (Dreamville)
 Smokepurpp - Lost Planet 2.0 (Alamo)
 Stunna 4 Vegas - BIG 4x (Billion Dollar Baby)
 Leven Kali - Low Tide
 Carly Rae Jepsen - Dedicated (Schoolboy)
 Moneybagg Yo - 43VA HEARTLESS (N-Less)
 Yoshi Flower - PEER PRESSURE (Rock Mafia/GRDN)
 Madonna - Madame X (Boy Toy/Live Nation)
 Nightly - Talk You Down
 X Ambassadors - ORION (KIDinaKORNER)
 K Camp - Wayy 2 Kritical (RARE Sound/EMPIRE)
 Pi'erre Bourne - The Life Of Pi'erre 4 (SossHouse)
 Mustard - Perfect Ten (10 Summers)
 Dreamville & J. Cole - Revenge of the Dreamers III (Dreamville)
 Machine Gun Kelly - Hotel Diablo (EST 19XX/Bad Boy)
 Ann Marie - Pretty Psycho (Zulu)
 Blacc Zacc - Trappin Like Zacc (SCMG)
 Cuco - Para Mi
 Nechie - SSN: Southside Nechie (The Full Story) 
 Lil Durk - Love Songs 4 The Streets 2 (OTF/Alamo)
 Lou The Human - Painkiller Paradise
 Various Artists - 13 Reasons Why: Season 3 (Soundtrack)
 Lana Del Rey - Norman Fucking Rockwell
 Earthgang - Mirrorland (Dreamville/Spillage Village)
 DaBaby - KIRK (SCMG)
 Dermot Kennedy - Without Fear (Riggins/Island)
 Summer Walker - Over It (LVRN)
 Melii - MOTIONS (Rule #1)
 Justin Rarri - 4EVARARRi
 Jayla Darden - Onto Something (a sick project)
 ROLE MODEL - oh, how perfect
 Only1Skoota - No Love Back
 QUIN - LUCID (Fantasy Soul)
 Tory Lanez - Chixtape 5 (Mad Love)
 BB Nobre - Por Fin
 Griselda - WWCD (Griselda/Shady)
 Yoshi Flower - I Will Not Let My Love Go To Waste (Rock Mafia/GRDN)
 Only The Family & Lil Durk - Family Over Everything (OTF/Alamo)
 Arin Ray - Phases II
 Lil Poppa - Almost Normal (Rule #1)
 Smino - High 4 Da Highladays (Zero Fatigue/Downtown)

2020s

2020 
 Moneybagg Yo - Time Served (N-Less)
 Selena Gomez - Rare
 Dreamville & J. Cole - Revenge of the Dreamers III: Director's Cut (Dreamville)
 Eminem - Music to Be Murdered By (Shady/Aftermath)
 Mura Masa - R.Y.C (Anchor Point)
 Stunna 4 Vegas - RICH YOUNGIN (Billion Dollar Baby)
 Tame Impala - The Slow Rush (Modular)
 Blacc Zacc - Carolina Narco (SCMG)
 X Ambassadors - Belong EP (KIDinaKORNER)
 renforshort - teenage angst EP (Renwasn'there Inc.)
 5 Seconds of Summer - C A L M
 Ari Lennox - Shea Butter Baby (Remix EP) (Dreamville)
 Tory Lanez - The New Toronto 3
 DaBaby - BLAME IT ON BABY (SCMG)
 K Camp - Kiss 5 (RARE Sound)
 Kali Uchis - TO FEEL ALIVE - EP (Virgin EMI)
 Leven Kali - HIGHTIDE
 Smoove'L - Boy From Brooklyn (Run Music)
 Khea - Trapicheo (Young Flex)
 YXNG K.A - BABY REAPER - EP (Double O)
 The 1975 - Notes on a Conditional Form (Dirty Hit)
 Mk.gee - A Museum Of Contradiction (IAMSOUND)
 Lady Gaga - Chromatica
 BLACKPINK - THE ALBUM
 Lil Poppa - Evergreen Wildchild 2 (Rule #1)
 Pi'erre Bourne - The Life of Pi'erre 4 (Deluxe) (SossHouse)
 6LACK - 6pc Hot EP (LVRN)
 Jessie Ware - What's Your Pleasure? (PMR/Virgin EMI)
 Louis The Child - Here for Now
 Juice WRLD - Legends Never Die (Grade A)
 Lil Mosey - Certified Hitmaker (AVA Leak) (Mogul Vision)
 Machine Gun Kelly - Tickets to My Downfall (Bad Boy)
 Spillage Village - Spilligion (Dreamville/SinceThe80s)
 Westside Gunn - Who Made the Sunshine (Griselda/Shady)
 BlocBoy JB -  FatBoy (Foundation)
 The Struts - Strange Days
 Stunna 4 Vegas - Welcome to 4 Vegas (Billion Dollar Baby)
 Playboi Carti - Whole Lotta Red (AWGE)

2021 
 BRS Kash - Kash Only (LVRN)
 Celeste - Not Your Muse (Atlas Artists)
 Nechie - Shady Baby
 slowthai - TYRON (Method/AWGE)
 Alexander 23 - Oh No, Not Again! EP
 Selena Gomez - Revelación (SMG)
 Bad Gyal - Warm Up (Aftercluv)
 Lana Del Rey - Chemtrails over the Country Club
 YXNG K.A. - REAPER SZN (Deluxe) (Double O)
 benny blanco - FRIENDS KEEP SECRETS 2 (Friends Keep Secrets)
 Vince Ash - VITO (Deluxe Edition) (Goliath) 
 Moneybagg Yo - A Gangsta's Pain (N-Less/CMG)
 Sir Sly - The Rise & Fall Of Loverboy
 Morray - Street Sermons (Pick Six)
 Lil Poppa - Blessed, I Guess (Rule #1)
 J. Cole - The Off-Season (Dreamville/Roc Nation)
 CLOVES - Nightmare On Elmfield Road
 42 Dugg - Free Dem Boyz (4PF/CMG)
 Mereba - AZEB EP
 renforshort - off saint dominique EP
 Maroon 5 - JORDI (222)
 Pi'erre Bourne - The Life of Pi'erre 5 (SossHouse)
 Jax Jones - Deep Joy EP (Deep Joy Edition)
 Inhaler - It Won't Always Be Like This
 OMB Bloodbath - Blood Sample EP (LVRN)
 EST Gee - Bigger Than Life or Death (Warlike/CMG)
 Dave - We're All Alone in This Together (Neighbourhood)
 Billie Eilish - Happier Than Ever (Darkroom)
 Allison Ponthier - Faking My Own Death
 glaive - all dogs go to heaven
 K CAMP - FLOAT (RARE Sound)
 Rosemarie - Sinnergy (Bird Vision)
 GRIP - I Died for This!? (Stray Society/Shady)
 OneRepublic - Human (Mosley)
 42 Dugg - Free Dem Boyz (Deluxe) (4PF/CMG)
 BIG30 - King Of Killbranch (N-Less/Bread Gang)
 Imagine Dragons - Mercury - Act 1 (KIDinaKORNER)
 Lady Gaga - Dawn of Chromatica
 LANY - gg bb xx (Side Street)
 NIKI, DJ Snake & 88rising - Shang-Chi and the Legend of the Ten Rings: The Album (MARVEL/Hollywood)
 Hayd - Changes EP
 Kacey Musgraves -  star-crossed (MCA Nashville)
 Co Cash - HIM, Not Them (Committed/Foundation)
 X Ambassadors - The Beautiful Liar (KIDinaKORNER)
 Ryan Trey - A 64 East Saga (#JUSTAREGULARDAY)
 Tony Bennett & Lady Gaga - Love for Sale (Columbia)
 Lute - Gold Mouf (Dreamville)
 glaive & ericoda - then i'll be happy (LISTEN TO THE KIDS)
 Sam Fender - Seventeen Going Under
 FINNEAS - Optimist (OYOY)
 Louis the Child - Euphoria
 Lana Del Rey - Blue Banisters
 Summer Walker - Still Over It (LVRN)
 HVN - ALL GIRLS GO TO HEAVEN (DON'T DIE/Field Trip)
 DaBaby - Back on My Baby Jesus Sh!t Again (SCMG)
 Gracie Abrams - This Is What It Feels Like
 Ama Lou - AT LEAST WE HAVE THIS
 KEVVO - Cotidiano
 Cozz - Fortunate (Tha Committee/Dreamville)
 EST Gee - Bigger Than Life Or Death, Pt. 2 (Warlike/CMG)
 LPB Poody - I’m The One (Chameleon)
 Juice WRLD - Fighting Demons (Grade A)
 TM88 & Pi'erre Bourne - Yo!88 (Capitol)

2022 
 42 Dugg and EST Gee - Last Ones Left (4PF/Warlike/CMG)
 Alexander 23 - Aftershock
 Ari Lennox - Age/Sex/Location (Dreamville)
 Ari Lennox - Away Message (Dreamville)
 Bas - [BUMP] Pick Me Up (Dreamville)
 BIG30 - Last Man Standing (Bread Gang/N-Less)
 Blackpink -  Born Pink (YG)
 CMG - Gangsta Art (CMG)
 Conway the Machine - God Don't Make Mistakes (Drumwork/Griselda/Shady)
 Cuco - Fantasy Gateway
 DaBaby - Baby on Baby 2 (SCMG)
 Dermot Kennedy - Sonder (Riggins/Island)
 Dreamville - D-Day: A Gangsta Grillz Mixtape (Dreamville)
 Earthgang - Ghetto Gods (Dreamville/Spillage Village)
 Eminem - Curtain Call 2 (Shady/Aftermath)
 EST Gee - I Never Felt Nun (Warlike/CMG)
 GloRilla - Anyways, Life's Great... (CMG) 
 J.I.D - The Forever Story (Dreamville)
 Ken Carson - X (Opium)
 Kendrick Lamar - Mr. Morale & the Big Steppers (pgLang/TDE/Aftermath)
 Machine Gun Kelly - Mainstream Sellout (Bad Boy)
 Lil Mosey - UNI (Mogul Vision)
 Lil Mosey - VER (Mogul Vision)
 Mozzy - Survivor's Guilt (CMG)
 Pi'erre Bourne - Good Movie (Sosshouse)
 Stunna 4 Vegas - Rae Rae’s Son (Billion Dollar Baby)
 Westside Boogie - More Black Superheroes (Shady)

References

Discography
Discographies of American record labels